Cecil Frena is a Canadian singer, songwriter, and pop music experimentalist.  Previously, Frena made music under the name Gobble Gobble, before he made the change in 2011 to Born Gold. His first album, Bodysongs, was released mid-2011. His second album, Little Sleepwalker, was released the following year. His third album, I Am An Exit, was released on 8 October 2013. On 31 August 2017, Cecil Frena announced the end of Born Gold, alongside the release of Unknow Yourself published under his own name.

Discography

As Born Gold
2011: Bodysongs
2012: Little Sleepwalker
2013: I Am An Exit
2015: No Sorrow Video Series

As Cecil Frena
2017: The Gridlock
2019: PIT BOSS

References

Canadian experimental musicians
Living people
Year of birth missing (living people)